Pecan oil is an edible pressed oil extracted from the pecan nut. Pecan oil is neutral in flavor and takes on the flavor of whatever seasoning is being used with it. Pecan oil contains 9.5% saturated fat, which is less than in olive oil (13.5%), peanut oil (16.90%) or corn oil (12.70%). It is also used as a massage oil and in aromatherapy applications.

Pecan oil is considered a healthy oil as it is rich in monounsaturated fats, specifically oleic acid, (52.0%) and low in saturated fats. It also contains linoleic acid (36.6%), and small amounts of palmitic (7.1%), stearic (2.2%) and linolenic acids (1.5%).  The overall balance of fatty acids in the oil may reduce LDL cholesterol (also known as "bad" cholesterol) and the risk of heart disease. 

The main application of this oil is its use in cooking. It has a high smoke point of 470 degrees F making it ideal for cooking at high temperatures and for deep frying. The mild nutty flavor enhances the flavor of ingredients, making it a popular component of salad dressings and dips. Pecan oil is much lighter than olive and is well suited for everyday cooking. It also generally does not contain preservatives or additives. Pecan oil is a good substitute for butter and other cooking oils, making it suitable for baking. It is recommended that the oil be refrigerated after opening to increase shelf life and reduce rancidity.

Pecan oil can sometimes be hard to find in local grocery stores because it is considered a specialty oil; however, it can be purchased  online through a number of manufacturers' websites.

Processing
Prior to extraction, the nuts are lightly roasted and ground. Mechanical extraction methods are then used to remove the oil. Most manufacturers avoid the use of chemical extraction methods in order to preserve the natural nutty flavor and nutrients of the oil.

Appearance
Pecan oil is a light weight oil and is usually pale yellow in color.

Uses
Cooking
Salad dressings
Dips
Massage oil
Aromatherapy
Cosmetics
Sunless tanning products
Bio-fuel

References

Vegetable oils
Nut oils
Oil